Oreta inflativalva is a moth in the family Drepanidae. It was described by Song, Xue and Han in 2012. It is found in China (Hainan).

The length of the forewings is 15.5–17 mm. The wings are brown, diffused with black scales, and indistinct slightly wavy reddish brown stripes. Both wings have a small white discal spot, the discocellulars of the forewings are decorated with white speckles.

Etymology
The species name refers to the expanded valva and is derived from Latin inflatus (meaning inflated, swollen) and the term valva.

References

Moths described in 2012
Drepaninae